The Santaquin Junior High School, located in Santaquin, Utah, United States, was built in 1935 as a Public Works Administration (PWA) project.  It was listed on the National Register of Historic Places in 1985.

It is a two-story brick school.  Additions during c.1950–60, while not compatible with its PWA Moderne original section, are on the side and rear and do not detract greatly from the architectural appearance.

References

School buildings completed in 1935
Public Works Administration in Utah
PWA Moderne architecture in Utah
School buildings on the National Register of Historic Places in Utah
Schools in Utah County, Utah
National Register of Historic Places in Utah County, Utah